The 1985 PBA season was the 11th season of the Philippine Basketball Association (PBA).

Board of governors

Executive committee
 Mariano A. Yenko, Jr. (Commissioner) 
 Tomas L. Manotoc (Deputy Commissioner)
 Carlos Palanca III  (President, representing Ginebra San Miguel)
 Qurino Marquinez (Vice-President, representing Great Taste Coffee Makers)
 Andrew H. Jao (Treasurer, representing Manila Beer Brewmasters)

Teams

Season highlights
The season marked the first time without the famed Crispa Redmanizers participating in the league. New team Shell Azodrin Bugbusters takes over the franchise of the defunct winningest ballclub. 
The PBA found a new home in the University of Life Theater and Recreational Arena (ULTRA) in Pasig after 10 years of playing at the Araneta Coliseum.
The Great Taste Coffee Makers continued its dynasty as they won their fourth straight title during the season and almost a Grandslam of sorts. 
A blockbuster trade took place between two-time MVP Ramon Fernandez of Manila Beer switching places with one-time MVP Abet Guidaben of Tanduay. Fernandez played his first game with the Rhum Makers starting in October.
The year saw the birth of a never-say-die squad known as Ginebra San Miguel with the 'Big J' Sonny Jaworski becoming the player-coach of the team starting the season. The Magnolia ballclub also offered the role of playing-coach to their returning import Norman Black at the start of the year.
Guest amateur team Northern Consolidated (NCC) won the PBA Third Conference crown over the Manila Beer Brewmasters and recorded the first-ever 4–0 finals sweep in league history.

Opening ceremonies
The muses for the participating teams are as follows:

Champions
 Open Conference: Great Taste Coffee Makers
 All-Filipino Conference: Great Taste Coffee Makers
 Reinforced Conference: Northern Consolidated (NCC)
 Team with best win–loss percentage: Great Taste Coffee Makers (44–27, .620)
 Best Team of the Year: Great Taste Coffee Makers (2nd)

Open Conference

Elimination round

Quarterfinal round

Semifinal round

Third place playoffs 

|}

Finals

|}
Best Import of the Conference: Norman Black (Magnolia)

All-Filipino Conference

Elimination round

Semifinal round

Third place playoffs 

|}

Finals

|}

Reinforced Conference

Elimination round

Quarterfinal round

Semifinal round

Third place playoffs 

|}

Finals

|}
Best Import of the Conference: Michael Hackett (Ginebra)

Awards
 Most Valuable Player: Ricardo Brown (Great Taste) 
 Rookie of the Year: Leo Austria (Shell)
 Most Improved Player: Padim Israel (Tanduay)
Best Import (Open): Norman Black (Magnolia)
Best Import (Reinforced): Michael Hackett (Ginebra)
 Mythical Five: 
Ricardo Brown (Great Taste)
Willie Pearson (Great Taste)
Abet Guidaben (Tanduay/Manila Beer)
Manny Victorino (Great Taste)
Bogs Adornado (Shell)
 Mythical Second Team: 
Robert Jaworski (Ginebra)
Willie Generalao (Tanduay)
Ramon Fernandez (Manila Beer/Tanduay)
Philip Cezar (Shell)
Abe King (Great Taste)
 All-Defensive Team: 
Chito Loyzaga (Ginebra)
Philip Cezar (Shell)
Elpidio Villamin (Manila Beer)
Robert Jaworski (Ginebra)
Abe King (Great Taste)

Cumulative standings

References

 
PBA